Schmidt Original Nabendynamo (SON) is a manufacturer of high-efficiency and low-drag bicycle hub power generators and other electric bicycle gear. The company is based in Tübingen, Southwest-Germany.

References

External links

Cycle parts manufacturers
Electric bicycles